Dusty Korek (born April 19, 1995 in Edmonton, Alberta) is a Canadian ski jumper of Polish descent. He competed for Canada at the 2014 Winter Olympics in Men's normal hill individual.

References 

1995 births
Canadian male ski jumpers
Canadian people of Polish descent
Ski jumpers at the 2012 Winter Youth Olympics
Living people
Olympic ski jumpers of Canada
Ski jumpers at the 2014 Winter Olympics
Sportspeople from Edmonton
Youth Olympic bronze medalists for Canada